Jerry's Kids may refer to:
 Children assisted by the Muscular Dystrophy Association are referred to as Jerry's Kids
 Jerry's Kids (band), one of the earliest Boston hardcore bands
 "Jerry's Kids", a song by punk group Sloppy Seconds, on the EP The First Seven Inches